Pathways of Belief is an educational British television series that shows viewers what people do in certain religions. It aired on BBC2 between 1996 and 2001. It ran for 6 series. The religions covered were Christianity, Sikhism, Islam, Hinduism, Buddhism and Judaism.

Episodes 
Series One 1996
Christianity 1  7 October 1996
Christianity 2  14 October 1996
Christianity 3  21 October 1996
Christianity 4  28 October 1996
Christianity 5  4 November 1996
Christianity 6  11 November 1996
Series Two 1997
Sikhism 1  3 October 1997
Sikhism 2  10 October 1997
Sikhism 3  17 October 1997
Sikhism 4  24 October 1997
Sikhism 5  31 October 1997
Sikhism 6  7 November 1997
Series Three 1998
Islam 1 5 October 1998
Islam 2 12 October 1998
Islam 3 19 October 1998
Islam 4 26 October 1998
Islam 5 2 November 1998
Islam 6 9 November 1998

BBC Television shows